Hasan Owleh (also Romanized as Ḩasan Owleh, Hasan Aūleh, Ḩasan Āvleh, and Ḩassan Avleh; also known as Āvleh Ḩasan) is a village in Sarkal Rural District, in the Central District of Marivan County, Kurdistan Province, Iran. At the 2006 census, its population was 273, in 60 families. The village is populated by Kurds.

References 

Towns and villages in Marivan County
Kurdish settlements in Kurdistan Province